Andrew Denton's Interview (also stylised as "interview") was an Australian talk show hosted by Andrew Denton and broadcast on the Seven Network from 17 April 2018. The series saw Denton sit down with celebrities and other notable individuals.

Following the conclusion of the second season, it was the decision of the team not to return for a third season.

Series overview

<onlyinclude>{| class="wikitable"
|-
! colspan="2" rowspan="2" width=3% |Season
! rowspan="2" width=5% |Episodes
! colspan="2" |Originally aired
|-
! width=15% | Season premiere
! width=15% | Season finale
|-
|bgcolor="1E90FF" height="10px"|
|align="center"| 1
|align="center"| 17
|align="center"| 17 April 2018
|align="center"| 7 August 2018
|-
|bgcolor="50C878" height="10px"|
|align="center"| 2
|align="center"| 16
|align="center"| 23 April 2019
|align="center"| 13 August 2019
|}

Episodes

Season 1 (2018)

Season 2 (2019)

References

External links
 
Andrew Denton's Interview on 7plus

Australian television talk shows
Seven Network original programming
Television shows set in Sydney
2018 Australian television series debuts
2019 Australian television series endings